Wilfrid Scawen Blunt (17 August 1840 – 10 September 1922), sometimes spelt Wilfred, was an English poet and writer. He and his wife Lady Anne Blunt travelled in the Middle East and were instrumental in preserving the Arabian horse bloodlines through their farm, the Crabbet Arabian Stud. He was best known for his poetry, which appeared in a collected edition in 1914, and also wrote political essays and polemics. He became additionally known for strongly anti-imperialist views that were still uncommon in his time.

Early life
Blunt was the son of Francis Scawen Blunt, of Crabbet, by his wife Mary Chandler. Blunt was born at Petworth House in Sussex, home of his aunt's husband Baron Leconfield. He served in the Diplomatic Service 1858–1869. He was raised in the faith of his mother, a Catholic convert, and educated at Twyford School, Stonyhurst, and at St Mary's College, Oscott. He was a cousin of Lord Alfred Douglas.

Personal life

In 1869 Blunt married Lady Anne Noel, daughter of the Earl of Lovelace and Ada Lovelace, and granddaughter of Lord Byron. Together the Blunts travelled through Spain, Algeria, Egypt, the Syrian Desert, and extensively in the Middle East and India. Based upon pure-blooded Arabian horses they obtained in Egypt and the Nejd, they co-founded Crabbet Arabian Stud, and later bought a property near Cairo named Sheykh Obeyd to house their horse-breeding operation in Egypt.

As an adult Blunt became an atheist, though he underwent episodes of faith. His writings and some of his friendships show he gained a strong serious interest in Islam. Blunt had supposedly become a convert to Islam under the influence of al-Afghani. He agreed before he died to see a priest, Fr Vincent McNabb, and receive Communion, so fulfilling a prediction of Sir William Henry Gregory, as recalled by his wife: "You will see Wilfrid will die with the wafer in his mouth."

In 1882, Blunt championed the cause of Urabi Pasha, which led to him being barred from Egypt for four years. Blunt was generally anti-imperialist as a matter of belief. His support for Irish independence led to imprisonment in 1888 for chairing an anti-eviction meeting in County Galway that had been banned by the Chief Secretary, Arthur Balfour. He was held in Galway Prison, then at Kilmainham Gaol in Dublin.

Blunt's three attempts to enter Parliament were unsuccessful. He stood as a "Tory Democrat" supporting Irish Home Rule at Camberwell North in 1885 and as a Liberal at Kiddermister in 1886, where he lost by 285 votes. While in prison in Ireland, he contested a Deptford by-election in 1888, but lost by 275 votes.

His most memorable line of poetry on the subject comes from Satan Absolved (1899), where the devil, answering a Kiplingesque remark by God, snaps back: "The white man's burden, Lord, is the burden of his cash." Here, Elizabeth Longford wrote, "Blunt stood Rudyard Kipling's familiar concept on its head, arguing that the imperialists' burden is not their moral responsibility for the colonised peoples, but their urge to make money out of them." Edward Said mentions Blunt by name when describing late 19th and early 20th century Orientalist authors: "[he] believed his vision of things Oriental was individual, self-created out of some intensely personal encounter with the Orient, Islam, or the Arabs" and "expressed general contempt for official knowledge held about the East." Notably, Said marked Blunt as exceptional in not exhibiting most other Orientalists' "final...traditional Western hostility to and fear of the Orient."

Wilfrid and Lady Anne's only child to reach maturity was Judith Blunt-Lytton, 16th Baroness Wentworth, later known as Lady Wentworth. As an adult, she was married in Cairo, but moved permanently to the Crabbet Park Estate in 1904.

Wilfrid had mistresses, including long-term relations with a courtesan, Catherine "Skittles" Walters, and a Pre-Raphaelite beauty, Jane Morris, the wife of his friend William Morris. Eventually he moved another mistress, Dorothy Carleton, into his home. This triggered Lady Anne's legal separation from him in 1906. At the time, Lady Anne signed a Deed of Partition drawn up by Wilfrid, under terms unfavourable to Lady Anne, whereby she kept the Crabbet Park property, where their daughter Judith lived, and half the horses, while Blunt took Caxtons Farm, also known as Newbuildings, and the rest of the stock. Always struggling with financial concerns and chemical dependency issues, Wilfrid sold off numerous horses to pay debts and constantly attempted to obtain additional assets. Lady Anne left the management of her properties to Judith and spent many months of each year in Egypt at the Sheykh Obeyd estate, moving there permanently in 1915.

Due primarily to Wilfrid's manœuvring to disinherit Judith and obtain the entire Crabbet property for himself, Judith and her mother were estranged at the time of Lady Anne's death in 1917. As a result, Lady Anne's share of the Crabbet Stud passed to Judith's daughters, under the oversight of an independent trustee. Blunt filed a lawsuit soon afterwards. Ownership of the Arabian horses went back and forth between the estates of father and daughter in subsequent years. Blunt sold more horses to pay off debts and shot at least four in an attempt to spite his daughter, an action which led to intervention of the trustee of the estate with a court injunction to prevent him from further "dissipating the assets" of the estate. The suit was settled in favour of the granddaughters in 1920 and Judith bought their share from the trustee, combining it with her own and reuniting the stud. Father and daughter briefly were reconciled shortly before Wilfrid Scawen Blunt's death in 1922, but his promise to rewrite his will to restore Judith's inheritance was not kept.

Blunt was a friend of Winston Churchill, aiding him in a 1906 biography of his father, Lord Randolph Churchill, Blunt having befriended him years earlier in 1883 at a chess tournament.

Work in Africa

In the early 1880s, Britain was increasing its influence in Egypt. It established a "veiled protectorate" through military occupation in 1882. In the autumn of 1881, Wilfrid Blunt's ship ran aground in the Suez Canal. Rather than remain idle at Suez for a few days, Blunt visited friends in Cairo. It is untrue that "he was sent to notify Sir Edward Malet, the British agent, of Egyptian public opinion about the recent changes in government and development policies." Blunt was in Cairo by accident and, again by accident, met Sheikh al Jasraji, who was close to Ahmed 'Urabi. Blunt then met his old friend Malet, the British Consul General, and began to play the role of intermediary.

In mid-December 1881, Blunt met with 'Urabi, known as Arabi or "El Wahid" (the Only One) due to his popularity with the Egyptians. 'Urabi was impressed with Blunt's enthusiasm and appreciation of Egyptian culture. Blunt was under the influence of Afghani's disciple, Muhammad Abduh and had recently written some articles on the Future of Islam. Their mutual respect helped 'Urabi to explain peacefully the reasoning behind his new nationalist movement, "Egypt for the Egyptians". Over the course of several days, Arabi explained the complicated background of the revolutionaries and their determination to rid themselves of the Ottoman oligarchy.

Wilfrid Blunt was not vital in the relay of this information to the British Consul General in Egypt, as everybody in Egypt knew that the indigenous Egyptians resented foreigners – whether they were Muslim Turko-Circassian or Christian Greek, Italian or Armenian – who were growing rich while the natives remained in poverty. Blunt felt he had been used by Malet and Colvin who were only pretending to be sympathetic to the Nationalists. However, Malet, Colvin, Cromer and other British officials dismissed Blunt as a romantic idealist of a quixotic type. Indeed, his own claim to be for Arabs what Byron had been to the Greeks, was sufficient to make him utterly ridiculous to the British public because he was not a good poet, whereas Byron was one of the greatest British poets of all time.

After the conflict, Blunt was banned from Egypt, while Urabi was exiled to Ceylon.

Blunt remained vigorously opposed to colonial expansion in Africa, writing three books outlining his views: The Secret History of the English Occupation of Egypt... (1907), Gordon at Khartoum (1911), and My Diaries: Being a Personal Narrative of Events, 1888-1914 (2 vols. 1919–1920). 

Historian Robert O. Collins wrote, The most vigorous English advocate of Egyptian nationalism, Blunt was both arrogant and irascible, his works scathing, discursive, and at times utterly ridiculous. Immature and unfair, both he and his writings must be used with caution, but even the dullest of men will come away stimulated if not aroused and with fresh insights to challenge the sometimes smug attitudes of British officials in Whitehall and Cairo. Of course, to them Blunt was anathema if not disloyal and Edward Mallet, the British Consul-General at Cairo from 1879 to 1883, replied to Blunt's charges in his posthumously published Egypt, 1879-1883 (London, 1909).

Egyptian Garden scandal
In 1901, a pack of foxhounds was shipped to Cairo to entertain the army officers. A fox hunt then took place in the desert near Cairo. The fox was chased into Blunt's garden, and the hounds and hunt followed it. As well as a house and garden, the land contained the Blunts' Sheykh Obeyd stud farm, housing a number of valuable Arabian horses. Blunt's staff challenged the trespassers – who, though army officers, were not in uniform – and beat them when they refused to turn back. For this, the staff were accused of assault against army officers and imprisoned. Blunt made strenuous efforts to free his staff, much to the embarrassment of the British army officers and civil servants involved.

Bibliography
Sonnets and Songs. By Proteus. John Murray, 1875
Aubrey de Vere (ed.): Proteus and Amadeus: A Correspondence Kegan Paul, 1878
The Love Sonnets of Proteus. Kegan Paul, 1881
The Future of Islam Kegan Paul, Trench, London 1882
Esther (1892)
Griselda Kegan Paul, Trench, Trübner, 1893
The Quatrains of Youth, 1898
Satan Absolved: A Victorian Mystery. J. Lane, London 1899
Seven Golden Odes of Pagan Arabia, 1903
Atrocities of Justice under the English Rule in Egypt T. F. Unwin, London, 1907
Secret History of the English Occupation of Egypt Knopf, 1907
India under Ripon; A Private Diary T. Fisher Unwin, London 1909
Gordon at Khartoum. S. Swift, London 1911
The Land War in Ireland. S. Swift, London 1912
The Poetical Works. 2 vols. . Macmillan, London 1914
My Diaries: Being a Personal Narrative of Events, 1888-1914. Secker, London 1919-1921; 2 vols. Knopf, New York 1921
Poems. Knopf, New York 1923; Macmillan, London 1923.

See also

Anthony Blunt

Notes

References and further reading
Luisa Villa, "A 'Political Education': Wilfrid Scawen Blunt, the Arabs and the Egyptian Revolution (1881–82)", Journal of Victorian Culture 17.1 (2012): 46–63
Edmund King GC., "Radicalism in the Margins: The Politics of Reading Wilfrid Scawen Blunt in 1920." Journal of British Studies 55.3 (2016): 501–518 online
Frank C. Sharp and Jan Marsh (2012), The Collected Letters of Jane Morris, Boydell & Brewer, London
Judith Anne Dorothea Blunt-Lytton, 16th Baroness Wentworth (1979), The Authentic Arabian Horse, 3rd ed., London: George Allen & Unwin
The Earl of Lytton (1961), Wilfrid Scawen Blunt. A Memoir by his Grandson, London: Macdonald
 includes some poems

 Blunt's political activities in the Middle East, by Martin Kramer

External links

The Penetration of Arabia: A Record of the Development of Western Knowledge Concerning the Arabian Peninsula from 1904 features Wilfrid Scawen Blunt
The Papers of Wilfrid Blunt at Dartmouth College Library

1840 births
1922 deaths
19th-century English poets
English atheists
English Roman Catholics
British diplomats
Victorian poets
People educated at Stonyhurst College
Alumni of St Mary's College, Oscott
People from Petworth
People educated at Twyford School
English male poets
Arabian breeders and trainers